The 1988 Centennial Cup is the 18th Junior "A" 1988 ice hockey National Championship for the Canadian Junior A Hockey League.

The Centennial Cup was competed for by the winners of the Abbott Cup, Dudley Hewitt Cup, the Callaghan Cup, and a 'Host' team.

The tournament was hosted by the Pembroke Lumber Kings in the city of Pembroke, Ontario.

The Playoffs
The Thunder Bay Flyers coached by Dave Siciliano won the United States Hockey League playoffs, despite that the team had 13 rookies. The Ottawa Citizen credited the team's success to its skating ability, puck control and aggressive forechecking. The Pembroke Lumber Kings defeated the Flyers in four consecutive games in the Dudley Hewitt Cup playoffs to determine the Central Canada "Junior A" champion. Since the Lumber Kings hosted the 1988 Centennial Cup tournament and received an automatic berth, the Flyers advanced to the Centennial Cup tournament as the Dudley Hewitt Cup finalists.

Round Robin

Results
Halifax Lions defeated Pembroke Lumber Kings  6-4
Notre Dame Hounds defeated Halifax Lions 6-5
Pembroke Lumber Kings defeated Thunder Bay Flyers 7-4
Notre Dame Hounds defeated Thunder Bay Flyers 9-7
Halifax Lions defeated Thunder Bay Flyers 6-4 OT
Pembroke Lumber Kings defeated Notre Dame Hounds 4-3 3OT

Semi-finals and Final

Awards
Most Valuable Player: Rod Brind'Amour (Notre Dame Hounds)
Top Scorer: Rod Brind'Amour (Notre Dame Hounds)
Most Sportsmanlike Player: Colin Power (Halifax Lions)
Top Defenceman: Kevin Reed (Pembroke Lumber Kings)

All-Star Team
Forward
Rod Brind'Amour (Notre Dame Hounds)
Duane Saulnier (Halifax Lions)
Brian Downey(Pembroke Lumber Kings)
Defence
Joby Messier (Notre Dame Hounds)
Kevin Reed (Pembroke Lumber Kings)
Goal
Darin Baker (Halifax Lions)

Roll of League Champions
AJHL: Calgary Canucks
BCJHL: Vernon Lakers
CJHL: Pembroke Lumber Kings
IJHL: Summerside Western Capitals
MJHL: Winnipeg South Blues
MVJHL: Halifax Lions
NOJHL: Sudbury Cubs
PCJHL: Grande Prairie North Stars
SJHL: Notre Dame Hounds

See also
Canadian Junior A Hockey League
Royal Bank Cup
Anavet Cup
Doyle Cup
Dudley Hewitt Cup
Fred Page Cup
Abbott Cup
Mowat Cup

References

External links
Royal Bank Cup Website

1988
Cup
Pembroke, Ontario